Ayloffe  is a surname. Notable people with the surname include:

Ayloffe baronets
Benjamin Ayloffe, multiple people
John Ayloffe (1645–1685), English lawyer, political activist, and satirist
William Ayloffe (disambiguation), multiple people

See also
Ayliffe